Satellite FC is an Ivorian football club based in Abidjan.

The team plays in the Championnat Division 3 the Ivorian Third Division.

Stadium
Currently the team plays at the 7000 capacity Stade Imam Ali Timité.

Notable players
Serge Maguy
Issa Zongo
Guillaume Dah Zadi

Performance in CAF competitions
2002 CAF Cup: semi-final

References

External links
Profile
Futbol24
Es.Wiki

Football clubs in Abidjan
Sports clubs in Ivory Coast